John M. Russell was a Scottish amateur football inside forward and wing half who made over 110 appearances in the Scottish League for Queen's Park.

References 

Year of birth missing
Scottish footballers
Scottish Football League players
Queen's Park F.C. players
Year of death missing
Association football inside forwards
Association football wing halves
Scotland amateur international footballers
Footballers from Glasgow